Ion Ciocanu (18 January 1940 – 2 July 2021) was a Moldovan literary critic.

Biography
Ion Ciocanu was born on January 18, 1940, in Tabani, Briceni, then in Romania. Ion Ciocanu graduated from Moldova State University in 1962 and got his PhD in 1965. He worked for Moldova State University, "Cartea Moldovenească", "Literatura artistică", "Hyperion", Glasul Naţiunii, Editura Litera. Between 1987 and 1990 he was a leader of the Moldovan Writers' Union. He has been working for the Institute of Philology of the Academy of Sciences of Moldova since 2001.

Between 1993 and 1994, Ion Ciocanu served as Director General of the State Department of Languages and between 1998 and 2001 he served as the head of the Division of the Promotion of Official Language.

Awards
 Om emerit, 1990
 Gloria Muncii, 1996
 Medalia "Mihai Eminescu", 2000
 Diploma săptămânalului Literatura şi Arta "pentru tenacitatea cu care apără limba română", 2003
 Diploma revistei Limba Română "pentru eleganţa şi profunzimea discursului, colaborare permanentă şi contribuţie substanţială la ocrotirea şi promovarea "celui mai sfânt şi mai scump odor" – Limba Română", 2001
 Premiul Pro didactica al Ministerului Culturii, 2009
 Laureat al publicaţiilor Literatura şi Arta (1997, 2000, 2001, 2003, 2004, 2005, 2007, 2008, 2009), Moldova Suverană (1990, 1993).
 Membru al colegiilor de redacţie ale revistelor Limba Română, Viaţa Basarabiei, Revistă de lingvistică şi ştiinţă literară.
 The award for literary criticism

Works
 Caractere şi conflicte, Chişinău (1968),
 Articole şi cronici literare, Chişinău (1969),
 Itinerar critic, Chişinău (1973),
 Unele probleme de estetică, Chişinău (1973),
 Dialog continuu, Chişinău (1977),
 Podurile vieţii şi ale creaţiei, Chişinău (1978),
 Clipa de graţie, Chişinău (1980),
 Paşii lui Vladimir Curbet, Chişinău (1982),
 Permanenţe, Chişinău (1983),
 Argumentul de rigoare, Chişinău (1985),
 Dreptul la critică, Chişinău (1993).
 Reflecţii şi atitudini, Chişinău (1993),
 Dincolo de literă, Timişoara (1998),
 Literatura română contemportană din Republica Moldova, Chişinău (1998),
 Rigorile şi splendorile prozei rurale, Chişinău (2000),
 Scriitori de ieri şi de azi  București (2004),
 Ion Ciocanu. Biobibliografie Chişinău, Ed. Museum (2005).
  Atât de drag... Microeseuri de dragoste pentru cuvânt, Chişinău, (1995),
  Zborul frânt al limbii române (1999),
  Realitatea în cuvânt şi cuvântul în realitate (2002),
  Conştientizarea greşelii (2003),
  Temelia nemuririi noastre, Chişinău, (2005).

Bibliography 
  Povară sau tezaur sfânt? Culegere de articole (scrse cu alfabet rusesc) alcătuită de Ilie Lupan, Chişinău, 1989
  Ciocanu, Ion, Reflecţii şi atitudini, Chişinău, Editura Hyperion, 1992
  Ciocanu, Ion, Atât de drag... Microeseuri de dragoste pentru cuvânt, Chişinău, 1995
  Ciocanu, Ion, Literatura română contemportană din Republica Moldova, Chişinău, 1998
  Ciocanu, Ion, Zborul frânt al limbii române, Chişinău, 1999
  Ciocanu, Ion, Conştientizarea greşelii, Chişinău, Editura Litera, 2003

References

External links 
 Timpul de dimineaţă, Ion Ciocanu, un strajer al limbii
 Vocea Basarabiei, Ion Ciocanu – la 70 de ani
 Ion Ciocanu: Un "plebeu" în arenă
 Academy of Sciences of Moldova, Ion Ciocanu – la 70 de ani
 Ion Ciocanu, Scriitorul între cele două cenzuri. Sud-Est, 2000
 A venit timpul ca moldovenii sa evolueze spiritual... Dialog cu Ion Ciocanu, scriitor, doctor habilitat in filologie
 A treia Conferinţă Internaţională a Centrului PEN Român
 Articol despre protestele contra introducerii obligativităţii limbii ruse în şcoli, 2002
 
 Basarabia şi România – un deceniu de integrare literară (34), Interviu. Contrafort
 Pagina oficială a ASM

1940 births
2021 deaths
People from Briceni District
Moldova State University alumni
Moldovan writers
Moldovan male writers
Recipients of the Order of Work Glory